Mohammad Janlu (also Romanized as Moḩammad Jānlū; also known as Moḩammad Jānī) is a village in Arshaq Sharqi Rural District, in the Central District of Ardabil County, Ardabil Province, Iran. At the 2006 census, its population was 90, in 21 families.

References 

Towns and villages in Ardabil County